The March, also known as The March to Washington, is a 1964 documentary film by James Blue about the 1963 civil rights March on Washington.  It was made for the Motion Picture Service unit of the United States Information Agency for use outside the United States – the 1948 Smith-Mundt Act prevented USIA films from being shown domestically without a special act of Congress.  In 1990 Congress authorized these films to be shown in the U.S. twelve years after their initial release.

In 2008, the film was selected for preservation in the United States National Film Registry by the Library of Congress as being "culturally, historically, or aesthetically significant".

See also
 Civil rights movement in popular culture
List of American films of 1964

Notes

External links
  on the US National Archives YouTube channel
 

1964 films
United States National Film Registry films
Documentary films about the civil rights movement
Documentary films about African Americans
1964 documentary films
Black-and-white documentary films
United States Information Agency films
American black-and-white films
Articles containing video clips
1960s English-language films
1960s American films